The 1935 Chicago Maroons football team was an American football team that represented the University of Chicago in the Big Ten Conference (Big Ten) during the 1935 college football season.  In their third season under head coach Clark Shaughnessy, the Maroons compiled a 4–4 record (2–3 against Big Ten opponents), finished in sixth place in the Big Ten, and were outscored by their opponents by a combined total of 110 to 102.

In December 1935, Chicago halfback Jay Berwanger became the first recipient of a trophy from the Downtown Athletic Club intended to honor "the most valuable player east of the Mississippi." John Heisman was then the club's athletic director, and after Heisman's death in October 1936 the trophy was expanded to become a national honor and named the Heisman Trophy.

Schedule

NFL Draft
One Maroon player was drafted as part of the inaugural NFL draft following the season.

References

Chicago
Chicago Maroons football seasons
Chicago Maroons football